Stephen McKeon is an Irish composer of film and television soundtrack music. He has received two Irish Film and Television Awards both for John Boorman films, Queen & Country in 2014 and The Tiger's Tail in 2004 and was previously nominated for Blind Flight, Savage and the children's animated feature Niko 2 - Little Brother, Big Trouble. His other works include: The Nephew (1998) and Borstal Boy (2000). He scored the 2011 biopic Hattie.

McKeon has written the scores of over 80 films, plus a number of Hercule Poirot TV movies, as well as many TV drama series including Black Mirror. He has also scored the fourth and fifth seasons of the British fantasy drama, Primeval.

He is a multi-instrumentalist whose work covers a wide spectrum from large orchestral scores to ambient guitar based music such as that written for the Scottish BAFTA winning film Summer.

External links
Official website

Year of birth missing (living people)
Living people
Irish film score composers
Male film score composers
Television composers